The Vicar of Vejlby is a 1922 Danish crime mystery film directed by August Blom. It is also known as The Hand of Fate. The silent film is based on a novella of the same name by Steen Steensen Blicher about a true murder case from 1626. Blom filmed the exteriors on location in the area of Grenaa and the village of Vejlby. International audiences praised Blom's adaptation for its "high level artistry," but its faithfulness to the original tragedy was deemed "too excessively sad" for American audiences.

The story was adapted again by George Schnéevoigt (see Praesten i Vejlby (1931 film)), and Claus Ørsted (see Praesten i Vejlby (1972 film)), but the Danish Film Institute considers Blom's version to be closest to the source material.

Plot
Søren Qvist, a village minister with a short-temper, is accused of murdering his unlikeable servant when the man disappears after an argument. Erik Sørensen, the local judge, reluctantly investigates but he is conflicted because he is happily betrothed to the minister's daughter, Mette. The judge becomes distraught as more and more witnesses offer evidence against the minister. The minister, although he doesn't remember any murder, believes the evidence is undeniable and decides to confess—condemning himself to death. The judge is forced to pass sentence—the pastor is beheaded—and Judge Sørensen's relationship with the woman he loves is destroyed. Twenty years later, the murder victim returns to the village. He reveals his alleged murder was a cruel hoax constructed by his brother as revenge for his rejection as a suitor for Mette.

Cast

References

External links 
Danish Film Institute (In Danish)
IMDb

1922 crime films
1920s historical films
1922 films
Danish black-and-white films
Danish crime films
Danish historical films
1920s Danish-language films
Films directed by August Blom
Danish silent films
Films set in the 1620s
Films set in the 1640s